The 15 kilometre cross-country skiing event was part of the cross-country skiing programme at the 1960 Winter Olympics, in Squaw Valley, California, United States. It was the second appearance of the event at its length of 15 km. The competition was held on Tuesday, February 23, 1960, at the McKinney Creek Stadium.

Håkon Brusveen of Norway won his only Olympic gold medal, 3 seconds ahead of the 30 km gold medallist, Sixten Jernberg. Defending Olympic champion and fellow Norwegian, Hallgeir Brenden finished 12th.

Results

References

External links
1960 Squaw Valley Official Olympic Report

Men's cross-country skiing at the 1960 Winter Olympics
Men's 15 kilometre cross-country skiing at the Winter Olympics